Modern pentathlon competitions at the 1999 Pan American Games in Winnipeg, Canada were held on July 31, 1999 at the Maples Complex. After being left of the Pan American Games program in 1991 and 1995, the sport made its return. A women's event was also contested for the first time.

Medal table

Medalists

Participating nations
A total of eight nations entered 24 modern pentathletes.

See also
Modern pentathlon at the 2000 Summer Olympics

References

Events at the 1999 Pan American Games
1999
Pan American Games